Catharina Point, also Varoli Point, is a rocky point projecting 1.5 km northwards into Drake Passage to form the north extremity of Robert Island in the South Shetland Islands, Antarctica and the northeast side of the entrance to Nevestino Cove.  The area was visited by early 19th century sealers operating from nearby Clothier Harbour.

The feature is named after the American sealing vessel Catharina under Captain Joseph Henfield that visited the South Shetlands in 1820–21.

Location

Maps
 L.L. Ivanov. Antarctica: Livingston Island and Greenwich, Robert, Snow and Smith Islands. Scale 1:120000 topographic map.  Troyan: Manfred Wörner Foundation, 2009.

References
 SCAR Composite Antarctic Gazetteer.

Headlands of Robert Island